The Call of the Toad is a film released in 2005 that tells the love story between a German man and a Polish woman who become caught up in the advent of modern capitalism in Poland. It is based on the novel The Call of the Toad written by Günter Grass.

Synopsis
In Gdańsk, Poland, in 1989, Alexander Reschke and Alexandra Piatkowska first meet on their way to a cemetery. Both are survivors from the end of World War II when many people from Poland and Germany were displaced as borders were re-drawn according to new treaties.

But they discover that displacement and war is not all they have in common.  They have both been widowed and due of their upheaval  - they share the belief that survivors such as themselves should have the right to be returned home for burial.

As their love affair grows, their ambitions become entwined.  The pair establishes a Cemetery of Reconciliation to show that old hatreds are now dead.  They form a company that arranges for survivors to be buried in their original country but as the money rolls in, their good intentions are corrupted.

Cast

Awards
Nominated Best Actress, Polish Film Awards.
Nominated Best Film Score, Polish Film Awards.
Nominated Best Production Design, Polish Film Awards.
Nominated Best Supporting Actor, Polish Film Awards.

External links
 
http://www.cinefacts.de/kino/566/unkenrufe/filmreview.html
http://www.moviemaster.de/archiv/film/film_3864.html
http://www.moviereporter.net/filme/309
https://web.archive.org/web/20110717011019/http://www.zelluloid.de/filme/index.php3?id=5140

2005 films
Films based on German novels
German drama films
Polish drama films
2000s German-language films
2000s Polish-language films
Films set in 1989
Films set in the 1990s
Films directed by Robert Gliński
Günter Grass
2005 multilingual films
German multilingual films
Polish multilingual films
2000s German films